Terry Braunstein (née Malikin; born 1942) is a photomontage artist based in Long Beach, California. Her work has used multiple media – photography, installation, assemblage, painting, printmaking, video, sculpture and large permanent public art. She also creates artists' books (more than 90, between 1972 and 2016) – some published, most one-of-a-kind artists' books.

Braunstein's art references the style and form of artists Hannah Höch, Max Ernst, Joseph Cornell, László Moholy-Nagy, and Alexander Rodchenko.

Biography
Terry Braunstein was born Helen Terry Malikin in Washington, D.C. She received her BFA from the University of Michigan in 1964 and her MFA in painting and printmaking from the Maryland Institute College of Art, where she studied with Grace Hartigan. She spent her junior year of college in Aix-en-Provence at l’Ecole des Beaux Arts on a Carnegie Grant. After receiving her MFA, she taught at Prince George's Community College, where she created the Printmaking Department, and later at Northern Virginia Community College. In 1976 she began teaching at the Corcoran School of Art, where she ultimately became the head of the 3rd Year Fine Arts Program and was named Professor Emeritus in 1986. When she moved to California in 1986, she was invited to be a visiting artist at California State University, Long Beach.

Recognition 
In 1985, Braunstein was awarded a Visual Artist Fellowship by the National Endowment for the Arts. In 1999, and in 2012, she was awarded fellowships by the City of Long Beach. She was invited to Saratoga Springs, New York, for artist's residencies at Yaddo in 1997, 1999, 2003, and 2005. She was the recipient of the National Book Award of the Library Fellows of the National Museum of Women in the Arts for 1994. The resulting work, A Tale from the Fire, was published in April 1995. Terry Braunstein was the recipient of an Open Channels video grant from the Long Beach Museum of Art in 1992. In 2008, she was awarded an ARC Durfee Grant.

Public art 
Terry Braunstein's first public art commission was for a Los Angeles Metro-Rail Blue Line station at Anaheim Street. She was commissioned to create two photo-installations for the Los Angeles County Museum of Art's "Windows on Wilshire" series, curated by Howard Fox. In 2007 she completed mosaics and colored windows for the Sun Valley Health Center through the Los Angeles County Arts Commission, and projects for the L.B. Transit at six different bus stations, a North Long Beach Entryway mosaic for the Redevelopment Agency of Long Beach, and assisted Councilwoman Gerrie Schipske with art enhancements for Rosie the Riveter Park.

In 2013, she collaborated with choreographer Cyrus Parker-Jeannette and animator David Familian to create an installation-sculpture ( high bookwork) titled Who is She? for a dance performance that was part of an NEA-funded project, A-Lot, through the Arts Council of Long Beach to bring art to underserved communities.

Collections 
Braunstein's work is in the collections of the Getty Center for the Arts and Humanities, the National Museum of American Art, the Smithsonian American Art Museum, Los Angeles County Museum of Art, the Museum of Fine Arts Houston, the Walker Art Center, Bibliothèque Nationale in Paris, the Sackner Collection of Concrete Poetry, the Museum of Contemporary Art, Chicago, the Long Beach Museum of Art, and the Special Collections Library of the Museum of Modern Art in New York. Her photomontage book, Windows, was published in 1982 by the William Blake Press and the Visual Studies Workshop.

Publications
 Anderson, Troy, "Cultural Side to Public Projects", LA Daily News, March, 2008 (photos)
 Berland, Dinah, "Seven Photographers Evoke the Symbolists", L.A. Reader, November 12, 1982
 Berland, Dinah, "Her Work is an Open Book," Los Angeles Times, August 15, 1982
 Bohn-Spector, Claudia, “Who is She? Terry Braunstein”, Who is She? Terry Braunstein, Long Beach Museum of Art, Thistle & Weed Press,  November 2015
 Bush, G.M., "Blue Line Platforms Get Touch of Artistry", L.B. Press Telegram, October 24, 1994
 Cara, Diego, "Terry Braunstein, ensoñadora de fantasías próximas", La Cronica, October 30, 1990  (photos)
 Cohen DePietro, Anne, Ed., The List, Independent Curators Incorporated, 1980
 Covarrubias, Amanda, "Campus Clinic Fills Need",  Los Angeles Times, April 8, 2008
 Crane, Barbara,"Three Women of Influence in L.B. Tell Different Stories", L.B. Business Journal, January 2004
 Creamer, Colleen, "Terry Braunstein, the Cutting Edge of Collage", Darkroom Photography interview, March, 1990 Vol. 12, Number 3, pp. 22–25, 58
 Curtis, Cathy, "Galleries", L.A. Times, October 2, 1992
 Davids, Betsy, "Book Arts from the Southland", Visions, Summer 1994
 Emenegger, Ashley, "Terry Braunstein: Station Identification; Terry Braunstein: Time Bound", THE Magazine
 Falces, Manuel, "La Magia del Fotomontaje", El Pais (Babelia), Madrid, Spain, February 15, 1997
 Falces, Manuel, "Instantaneas de lo disperso", El Pais (Babelia), Madrid, Spain, September 9, 1995
 Falces, Manuel, "La Primavera Fotografica se abre con imágenes históricas y las últimas tendencias del fotomontaje", El Pais, April 25, 1990
 Falces, Manuel, "Entornos reciclados", El Pais (Babelia), May 19
 Fontcuberta, Joan, "Sempre ens que da la ironia", l'Avui, April 25, 1990
 Forgey, Benjamin, "Book as Art", Washington Star, March 13, 1980
 Fox, Howard, Terry Braunstein: Voyages, Centro Andaluz de la Fotografia publication to accompany exhibition (October, 1990)
 Gamblin, Noriko, Curator, Terry Braunstein: Stations,  Long Beach Museum of Art publication to accompany exhibition (April 4 - June 2, 1991)
 , Shirle, "Terry Braunstein", Art Scene, March 2009
 , Shirle,  "Book Mark", Long Beach Press Telegram, December 15, 2006
 , Shirle, "Windows Turning Heads on Wilshire", Press-Telegram, October 6, 1997
 , Shirle, "South Bay Smorgasbord", Visions, Winter 1993
 Guillamon, Julia, "Un nuevo reparto de atribuciones", La Vanguardia, April 24, 1990
 Gunter, Veronika Alice and Jane LaFerla, ed. The Penland Book of Handmade Books (New York: Lark Books, 2004)
 Hassan, Michael, "Reading Journeys Through Bookland by Terry Braunstein", Word & Image, The Ampersand, Quarterly Journal of the Pacific Center for the Book Arts, Volume 12, No. 3 & 4
 Harvey, Steve, "Drive-by Art (Only in L.A.)", Los Angeles Times, October 1, 1997 (photo)
 Hennessey, Tom, "Cerritos Artist Has it Covered",  L.B. Press Telegram, February 18, 2007
 Hennessy, Tom, "Navy Memorial Great for Long Beach", L.B. Press Telegram, September 3, 2004
 Hoffberg, Judith, "Collage Logic", Visions, Fall 1991
 Hubert, Renée Riese & Judd D. The Cutting Edge of Reading: Artists' Books (New York: Granary Books, Inc., 1999)
 Hunt, Tamara, "Window Into Art", Los Angeles Times, November 16, 1997 (photo)
 Joselow, Beth, "H. Terry Braunstein", Washington Review, interview, January 1987 pp. 3–6
 Lewis, JoAnn, "Things They Don't Teach You in Collage", Washington Post, April 8, 1988
 Lewis, JoAnn, "Braunstein's Fantasy Montages", Washington Post, October 18, 1986
 Lewis, JoAnn, "Art Through the Pages", Washington Post, October 7, 1982 (photos)
 Lewis, JoAnn "Sculpted Books", Washington Post, March 15, 1980
 McCoy, Mary, "Books Revised with Vision" Washington Post, January 28, 1995
 Merino, Jose F., "Colvin, Braunstein y America Sanchez exponen desde hoy en la Universidad", El Adelanto
 Mohr, Bill, "Braunstein's Collages Spotlight Struggles of Women", Press Telegram,  April 23, 1989
 Myers Jr., George, Alphabets Sublime: Contemporary Artists on Collage & Visual Literature (Washington D.C.: Paycock Press, 1983)
 Myers Jr., George, "Terry Braunstein: Perceptive Bookmaker", Umbrella, interview fall, 1983
 Schneider, "Life in the Media World", Artweek, May 2, 1991
 U.S. Department of Transportation, Art in Transit publication citing outstanding public art works in transit systems across the United States, 1995
 Wasserman, Krystyna The Book as Art: Artists' Books from the National Museum of Women in the Arts (New York: Princeton Architectural Press, 2007)

Personal life 
She is married to David Braunstein and has two children.

References

External links 
 
 Vamp and Tramp artist page
 Metro artist page
 Jewish Artists Initiative Artist Page

1942 births
American artists
Living people
People from Long Beach, California
University of Michigan alumni
20th-century American women artists
21st-century American women artists